Yol is a cantonment town in Kangra district in the Indian state of Himachal Pradesh.

History
The town gets its name from YOL (Young Officers Living), a small town established by British Indian Army around 1849. The Yol Cantt. (cantonment) was built in 1942. Formerly it was known as "majhaitha" village. Yol is the headquarters of the 9 Corps of Indian Army.

Yol was the location of a Prisoner-of-war camp which hosted German soldiers in the First World War and Italian soldiers in the Second World War. Frogman Elios Toschi, a member of the pre-Armistice Decima Flottiglia MAS and inventor of the "maiale", was one of the very few to escape from the camp. After the war, the former POW facility hosted ethnic Tibetan refugees from China.

Geography

Yol is situated 10 km southwest of Dharamsala on the Dharamshala-Chamunda Devi-Palampur road and about 15 km northeast of Kangra town. The nearest railway station is Nagrota Bagwan about 12 km away in south on  narrow gauge railway line originating at Pathankot. The nearest broad gauge railhead is Pathankot. The nearest airport is Gaggal airport (IATA airport code DHM), also known as Kangra airport, about 15 km to the west through Dharamshala

Demographics
 India census, Yol had a population of 10,772. Males constitute 52% of the population and females 48%. Yol has an average literacy rate of 77%, higher than the national average of 59.5%: male literacy is 80%, and female literacy is 74%. In Yol, 12% of the population is under 6 years of age.

References

External links
  https://web.archive.org/web/20100919002944/http://www.shipwrecksofegypt.com:80/images/shippages/gondar.html Site of the Gondar wreck off Alexandria harbour
  http://www.loccidentale.it/articolo/la+storia+dei+diecimila+soldati+italiani+prigionieri+in+india+%281a+parte%29.0085440 History of the 10,000 Italian POWs in Yol (part one)
  http://www.loccidentale.it/articolo/a.0085800 History of the 10,000 Italian POWs in Yol (part two)
  http://www.loccidentale.it/articolo/elenco+dei+prigionieri+italiani+a+yol+(india).0085514 List of the Italian POWs in Yol camp (may be subject to updates).

Cities and towns in Kangra district
Populated places established in 1849
Cantonments of India
Cantonments of British India
1849 establishments in British India